To All the Boys is a franchise consisting of American teenage romance installments, including three feature films and a spin-off television series, based on the titular trilogy of novels written by Jenny Han. Starring Lana Condor and Noah Centineo in the central roles, the plot centers around Lara Jean Song-Covey (Condor), a shy teenager who writes five letters—ones she never planned to send—to boys that she has had crushes on. The films show her experiences after the letters are received by the young men.

The series is produced by Netflix and released exclusively through its streaming services. The first film, released in 2018 was critically acclaimed, and became one of the company's most-viewed original films. Following its success, Netflix quickly began developing the two sequels, released in 2020 and 2021 respectively, both of which received positive reviews from critics.

The franchise is continuing with a spin-off TV series, centered around Kitty Song-Covey, which is in development.

Origin

The book To All the Boys I've Loved Before was published in April 2014, and spent 40 weeks as a New York Times Best Selling young adult romance novel. By June 2014, the novel's film adaptation rights were purchased by Overbrook Entertainment, the production company owned by Will Smith and James Lassiter.

The second installment, P.S. I Still Love You, was released in May 2015, and five weeks on The New York Times Best Seller list, peaking sales at #2 in the Young Adult fiction section. The third installment, Always and Forever, Lara Jean, was released in May 2017.

Films

To All the Boys I've Loved Before (2018)

Film rights were attained in June 2014, with Susan Johnson serving as director from a screenplay by Sofia Alvarez. Lana Condor was cast to star as Lara Jean Song-Covey. Noah Centineo was cast to co-star, with the rest of the film's roles the following month. Production took place in Vancouver, British Columbia, Canada, and Portland, Oregon, USA. Photography took place from July 5, 2017, to August 4, 2017.

To All the Boys I've Loved Before was released exclusively on Netflix on August 17, 2018.

To All the Boys: P.S. I Still Love You (2020)

Following the success of the first film, Netflix, Paramount Pictures and Awesomeness Films began to discuss a sequel. The film was greenlit by December 2018, with Condor and Centineo signed to reprise their roles. By March 2019, Michael Fimognari, cinematographer on the first film, was hired to make his directorial debut. Director of the first film, Susan Johnson, will serve as executive producer. Jordan Fisher was cast as John Ambrose McClaren, a past love of Lara Jean's who joins the project, and complicates the two main characters' relationship.

Filming took place once more in Vancouver, British Columbia, Canada and lasted from March 27, 2019, to May 10, 2019. To All the Boys: P.S. I Still Love You, was released exclusively on Netflix on February 12, 2020.

To All the Boys: Always and Forever (2021)

In August 2019, a third film was announced to be in development with confirmation that it was already into production. The feature adapts the author's third novel, with Fimognari once again serving as director, with a script by Katie Lovejoy.

Production was announced to have officially begun on July 15, 2019, two months after production on the second film wrapped. To All the Boys: Always and Forever was released exclusively on Netflix on February 12, 2021. The film was retitled from its tentative title, synonymous with the name of the novel.

Television 

In April 2021, a spin-off series featuring the character Kitty Song-Covey, was announced to be in development as a Netflix exclusive. Anna Cathcart reprises her role in the series, with a story centered around her search for love. Jenny Han serves as creator, writer, showrunner, and executive producer. The pilot episode will be co-written by Han and Siobhan Vivian. The series is intended to include 30-minute romantic comedy episodes. The project will be a joint-venture production between Awesomeness TV, ACE Entertainment, and Netflix Original Series.

In October 2021, the series entered production and was officially ordered by Netflix with the title XO, Kitty. The plot will center around Kitty Song-Covey, who sees herself as an expert matchmaker, and thinks she has love figured out. Once she moves around the world to reunite with her long-distance boyfriend, she discovers she has a lot to learn about romance. Han and Sascha Rothchild will serve as co-showrunners, in addition to serving as an executive producers with Matt Kaplan.

Main cast and characters

Additional production and crew details

Critical reception

References 

Film series introduced in 2018
Film series based on American novels
Romance film series